Lila Firoz Poonawalla (born 16 September 1944) is an Indian industrialist, philanthropist, humanitarian and the founder of Lila Poonawalla Foundation, a non governmental organization promoting professional education among aspiring girls in India by providing scholarships and guidance. She is one of the pioneering Indian woman to secure a professional degree in Mechanical Engineering from College of Engineering Pune (COEP) and is a former chairperson of Alfa Laval India and TetraPak India. She was awarded the fourth highest civilian award of Padma Shri by the Government of India in 1989, the Order of the Polar Star by Carl XVI Gustaf, the King of Sweden, in 2003 and Royal Order of the Polar Star – Commander 1st Class (Royal Order of the Seraphim) in 2019.

Biography
Lila Poonawalla, née Lila Thadani, was born on 16 September 1944 in Hyderabad in the Sindh region in British India as one of the five children in a Sindhi family. She lost her father when she was three years old and, during the partition of India, her family moved to India as refugees to settle in Pune. She did her early education in Pune after which she graduated in mechanical engineering with first class from the Government College of Engineering under the University of Pune in 1967. 

She started her career as an apprentice at Ruston and Hornsby where she met with her future husband, Firoz Poonawalla, who was from a Dawoodi Bohra family and was working in the same company. As the company rules prohibited the members of the same family working together, she moved, as a trainee engineer, to the Indian division Alfa Laval, the Swedish multinational, where she worked in various positions to rise to hold the office of the chairperson in a span of two decades, thus becoming one of the first woman CEOs in India. During her career, she pursued management studies at the Indian Institute of Management, Ahmedabad, Harvard University and Stanford University. Under her management, Alfa Laval India operations grew from 500 million to 2.5 billion and eventually she took over the TetraPak operations in India as its Chief Executive Office, serving the companies till her retirement in 2001. Poonawalla couple have no children and live in Pune where Firoz Poonawalla has based his floriculture export business.

Legacy and positions
Poonawalla's contributions are reported behind the establishment of a Pune-Swedish chapter at the Maharashtra Chamber of Commerce, Industry and Agriculture (MACCIA) which came into being in 2001. After her retirement from Alfa Laval, she opened a consultancy firm under the name, Lila Consulting Services Company, and acts as an advisor to several companies; Schlumberger, USA and Arco Safety Equipment, UK featuring among her clients. She is involved with the Quality Circle Forum of India at its Maharashtra Chapter where she is the Chairperson Emeritus. She is the founder director of Pune Citizens’ Police Foundation, sits on the board of Ashta No Kai, an NGO involved in the welfare of rural communities, and is the vice president of Pune Blindmen’s Association. She is also a member of the Pune Divisional Committee of World Wildlife Fund and the Governing Council of Sanskriti Institute of Management and Leadership.

Poonawalla has been associated with the Government of India by serving as a member of the Scientific Advisory Committee, when A. P. J. Abdul Kalam served as its chairman, the Herbal and Floritech Sub-Committee of the Scientific Advisory Committee to the Government and the Technology Information Forecasting & Assessment Council (TIFAC) of the Department of Science and Technology. Her association with the education sector included the memberships of the Core Group of the University Grants Commission, the academic councils of Pune University, Jawaharlal Nehru University and Symbiosis Management Institute, the steering committee of Pune Vyaspeeth, the Science and Technology Park of Pune University and the governing council of the Centre for Development of Advanced Computing. She has served as a member of the executive council of the Confederation of Indian Industry and has held the chair of the Food Task Force of the association. She was the founder chairperson of the Indo-Swiss Vocational Training Trust and was involved in the establishment of the International Biotech Park in Pune as a member of the sub group on conceptualization. She is also a former member of the advisory committee of the Life Insurance Corporation of India.

Lila Poonawalla Foundation
Established 27 years ago by Mrs. Lila Poonawalla (recipient of the Padma Shri award, 1989) and Mr. Firoz Poonawalla, Lila Poonawalla Foundation (LPF) is a Nonprofit Public Charitable Trust in India. LPF works towards the cause of promoting Girls Education and Women Empowerment by offering Merit-cum-Need based Scholarship and Skill Building programs. LPF is accredited by the Credibility Alliance.

Through merit-cum-need based scholarship, skill-building, counseling and mentoring interventions, we have been transforming academically clever but financially challenged diffident young girls into strong self-confident women leaders in the workplace as well in their communities and for bringing societal change at large.

Since its inception and with a motto of ‘Leading Indian Ladies Ahead (LILA)’, LPF has transformed the lives of 12,000+ girls and their 75,000+  family members.

UNDERGRADUATION (UG) &  SKILL BUILDING PROJECT 
LPF offers Undergraduate Merit – cum- Need Based Scholarship and Skill Building to girls pursuing Engineering, Engineering after Diploma, Nursing,Pharmacy and Sciences in Pune, Wardha, Amravati District and Nagpur City, Hyderabad City and District, Telangana & Benguluru City and District in Karnataka. 

Skill Building (holistic training and development programs), exposure visits, internships & placement support is provided to the girls by industry experts as well as through corporate partner engagements/employee volunteering.

An award function is organized for the newly selected LILA Girls where the girls are awarded the scholarships by noted personalities from the industry and LPF Alums.

The newly awarded LILA Girls undergo an orientation program conducted by the LPF Team. So far over 9,000 girls have been supported through this initiative.

POSTGRADUATION (PG) &  SKILL BUILDING PROJECT 
LPF offers Postgraduate Merit – cum- Need Based Scholarship and skill building to girls pursuing their post graduation in multiple streams within the Pune District.

Skill Building (holistic training and development programs), exposure visits, internships & placement support is provided to the girls by industry experts as well as through corporate partner engagements/employee volunteering.

An award function is organized for the newly selected LILA Fellows where the girls are awarded the scholarships by noted personalities from the industry and LPF Alums.

The newly awarded LILA Fellows undergo an orientation program conducted by the LPF Team. So far over 1,000 girls have been supported through this initiative.

‘2MORROW 2GETHER - School Project 
(Scholarship, Infrastructure Support & Skill Building Interventions)
LPF took a bold step to start  ‘2morrow 2gether’  - School Project  in 2011 to support the girls’ education at early stage i.e. school level.
The project aims at increasing access to quality school education for a girl child from disadvantaged families by providing scholarships from the age 12 onwards i.e. from 7th grade right up to her graduation in the non-aided and partially aided schools in rural areas of Pune and within the city of Pune. So far over 2,270 girls have been supported through this initiative.

Awards and honours
Poonawalla has been awarded several minor and major awards, including two State Awards such as the civilian honour of Padma Shri from the Government of India in 1989 and the Order of the Polar Star from the King of Sweden in 2003. Her professional career earned her awards such as Best Lady Executive Award, Best in International Marketing Award, Marketing Man of the Year, Vijay Ratna, FIE Award for Excellence, Udyog Jyoti, Udyog Rattan Award, Rashtriya Udyog Award, Bharat Udyog Gold Medal, Udyog Bhushan Puraskar, Pune Super Achievers Award, Top Management Consortium Award of Excellence, Women Achievers Award 2012 and ZEAL Leadership Award 2012. 

She has been honoured for her social and philanthropic activities with awards which included Lady of the Decade Award, Shiromani Mahila Award, Four Way Test Award, Kohinoor Ratna, International Woman of the Year, Rajiv Gandhi Excellence Award, Global India Excellence Award, Samajshree Award, Hind Gaurav Award, Indira Gandhi Memorial Award, Pune's Pride Award, Suryadatta National Award, Rotary Club of Poona Midtown Service Excellence Award and Gurujan Gaurav Award. She has also received two lifetime achievement awards; Indian Women Scientists' Association Lifetime Achievement Award and Indira Group of Institutes Life Time Achievement Award. She was the Chairperson of Board of Governors of Indian Institute of Technology, Ropar

See also
 List of Indian businesswomen

References

Recipients of the Padma Shri in trade and industry
Order of the Polar Star
1944 births
People from Hyderabad District, Pakistan
Sindhi people
Indian industrialists
Indian chief executives
Social workers
Indian women philanthropists
Indian philanthropists
Indian humanitarians
Savitribai Phule Pune University alumni
Indian women educational theorists
Living people
Indian women chief executives
 People from Hyderabad, Sindh